Plus−minus (+/−,  ±, plus/minus) is a sports statistic used to measure a player's impact on the game, represented by the difference between their team's total scoring versus their opponent's when the player is in the game. In ice hockey, it measures a player's goal differential. When an even-strength goal or shorthanded goal is scored, the plus–minus statistic is increased by one ("plus") for those players on the ice for the team scoring the goal but decreased by one ("minus") for those players on the ice for the team allowing the goal.  Power play or penalty shot goals are excluded. Empty net situations are treated the same as having the goalie in net for the purposes of plus-minus: i.e., unless the scoring team is on a power play, empty net goals still count in its calculation. 

The statistic is sometimes called the plus−minus rating.

A player's plus−minus statistic is calculated for each game played, to provide a more meaningful measure over a full season.  The statistic is directly affected by overall team performance, influenced by both the offensive and defensive performance of the team as a whole.

History
The NHL's Montreal Canadiens were the first team to track the plus−minus of its players, starting sometime in the 1950s. Other teams followed in the early 1960s, and the NHL started officially compiling the statistic for the  season. While Emile Francis is often credited with devising the system, he only popularized and adapted the system in use by the Canadiens.

Awards

The Western Hockey League (WHL) awards the WHL Plus-Minus Award each year to one of its players.

Situational plus–minus 
There are some drawbacks to the traditional calculation of the plus–minus statistic in ice hockey.  Not all types of goals are included, specifically power play goals.  Every goal included in the calculation is weighted the same regardless of the situation - even strength, power play, short-handed or empty net.  Also, traditional plus–minus is not applied to goaltenders.

Situational plus–minus (Sit +/–) is an alternative calculation that takes into account all types of "team-based" goals, which excludes only penalty shot and shootout goals.  Each goal is weighted based on the number of skaters (i.e. not goaltenders) on the ice.  The plus–minus rating is calculated by dividing the number of skaters on the ice for the team scored upon by the number of skaters on the ice for the scoring team, applied as a plus to all players (including goaltenders) on the ice for the scoring team and as a minus for all players (including goaltenders) on the ice for the team scored upon.

The following is a list of situational plus−minus leaders by season, going back to the 2008-09 season (82 games, unless otherwise noted):

Notes:

(a) 2012–13 season shortened due to lockout (48 games).

(b) 2019–20 season shortened due to the COVID-19 pandemic (68–71 games).

(c) 2020–21 season shortened due to the COVID-19 pandemic (56 games).

Basketball
Although the statistic was pioneered in the sport of hockey, it has found its way into use in other sports and areas of life.  For instance, the NBA's Houston Rockets first utilized a modified version of the stat, which helped reveal the unheralded effectiveness of light-scoring Shane Battier. It is now in regular use throughout the NBA.

Football
A plus−minus statistic has been used in sports economics to analyze the degree of competitive balance over time in association football.

References

Ice hockey statistics
Ice hockey terminology